Syed Safdar Hussain Najafi (مولانا سید صفدر حسین نجفی) was a scholar and religious leader.

Social background

Family and childhood
Syed Safdar Hussain Najafi was born in 1932 at Alipur, a tehsil of Muzaffargarh District in the Panjab province of Pakistan. He is the son of Syed Ghulam Sarwar Naqvi from a well known Naqvi Syed family. He descended from Syed Jalal-ul-Din Surkhposh Bukhari (and his grandson Jahaniyan Jahangasht is buried in the Uch), who was from a branch of the scions of Imam Ali Naqi.

Education in Pakistan

His uncle Muhammad Yar Shah proceeded to Najaf Ashraf and returned from there in 1940. He started his early education at the age of three years in the holy lap of his mother by learning of Quran. After that he began his religious education from Ustad ul Ulama at the age of 8 years.

Basic education
 Madrasa of Ustad Allama Syed Muhammad Baqir Naqvi Chakrralvi, he was famous as Allama Baqir Hindi in Indopak. His Madrasa was located at the village (Chak) No. 38 in Khanewal, for 6 months, (1940).
 Madrasa Bab ul Uloom, Multan, for 2 months, (1940).
 Madrasa Thuta Sial in the environs of Muzaffargarh District, for 6 months, (1940 & 1941).
 Madrasa in Jalalpur Nangiana Sargodha, for 4 years, (1941–1945).
 Madrasa in Seetpur, Muzaffargarh District, for 6 months, (1946).
 Madrasa Bab ul Uloom, Multan (again) Maulana Syed Zain ul Abedin and Maulana Sheikh Muhammad Yar Fazil e Lakhnao, (1946).
 a Sunni Madrasa in Multan.

Secondary education
 Madrasa Sadeqiya, Khanpur, Rahim Yar Khan District, Maulana Allama Hussain Bakhsh Jarra (1947) commentary of the Quran.
 Madrasa in Khangarh, Maulana Ahmed Hassan, Shara Jami, Qutbi and Shara Bab e Hadi Ashar (1949).
 Madrasa Bab un Najaf in village Jarra, Dera Ismail Khan, Allama Hussain Bakhsh Jarra

Education in Najaf Ashraf
On 17 October 1951 he went to Najaf Ashraf.

Higher education
 Kifaya, Rasael and Makasib for 4 years in Najaf Ashraf.
 Dars e kharij for one year.
His mentors in Najaf Ashraf were
 Grand Ayatollah Syed Muhsin ul-Hakim,
 Grand Ayatollah Abul Qasim Khoei,
 Allama Sheikh Muhammad Ali Afghani,
 Allama Syed Abul Qasim Rashti,
 Grand Ayatollah Agha Buzurg Tehrani (who gave him the certification (Ijaza) of the Hadith).
 Sheikh Muhammad Taqi Aal e Razi
 Sheikh ul Jamea Allama Akhtar Abbas Najafi.
After 5 years in the Holy City in 1956 Allama Syed Safdar Hussain Najafi returned to his homeland Pakistan.

Activities in Pakistan

Majalis

Pakistan
 Lahore.
 Multan.
 Karachi.
 ...

Iran
 Mashad.
 Qum.
 Tehran.

United Kingdom
 London.
 Manchester.
 ...

United States
 Washington D.C.

-

Religious organizations
 Wifaq ul Ulama Shia Pakistan.
 Tahrik e Nifaz e Fiqh e Jafaria Pakistan (TJP).
 Wifaq ul Madaris Shia Pakistan.
 Imamia Students Organisation.
 Imamia Organization.
 Misbah ul Quran Trust. (in 1985)
 Imamia Publications.

Introduction of Imam Khomaini
He introduced the personality of Imam Khomaini before 14 years of Islamic revolution of Iran and that time little peoples knows about Imam Khomaini he introduced him in Pakistan first time and he translated Imam Khomaini's "Tozih ul masail" in 1969 and he introduce Imam Khomaini in young generation in Pakistan first time, he was a true lover of Imam Khomaini. there was strong relation between Imam Khomaini and Allama Najafi through the letters and messages. Imam Khomaini always appreciated the efforts of Allama Najafi and once upon a time Allama Najafi and his mission partner Seith Nawazish Ali both met Imam Khomaini in France and requested him to stay in Pakistan. Imam Khomaini appreciated their suggestion. After the death of Imam Khomaini, Allama Najafi left Qum, Iran with these words: "Now it's hard to stay here without Imam Khomaini" and in same year six months after the death of Imam Khomaini Allama Najafi also died on 3 December 1989 in Lahore, Pakistan.

Development and awareness of Islamic knowledge in women
He did lot of work for development and increasing basic Islamic knowledge among women in Pakistan. He made organisations and set up their educational institutions. He address with their gatherings and so many book for them and guide them in every field of life and he believed that only good mothers can develop and give us good Islamic society, because the mother's lap is the first institute of knowledge and Tarbiyat. He always requested women to follow the life and character of Fatimah Zahra and he introduced Islamic Hijab in women society.

Political efforts and solution of crises
He was not against politics. He was against the wrong things in which politicians were doing in the name of politics.

After the death of Allama Mufti Jafar Hussain, the main problem was leadership in Pakistan and through his loving and charming personality he solved the problem. When he was selected as Shia leader in meeting held on 10 February 1984 in Bhakkar, he explained his mission. He said: "My mission of life is to make up schools and set up a worldwide educational system and I suggest the name of Syed Arif Hussain as the leader of my Nation". The scholars accepted his decision. Through his leadership he did a lot of hard work for Islamic education. He was well aware of national and international politics and always kept his eyes on the future problems and their solutions.

Institutions (Madaris)
When he took charge as a principal of Jamea tul Muntazar in 1966 there were only five Shia Madaris including Jamea tul Muntazar in Pakistan. Today there are more than 425 Madaris in Pakistan. It is the restless and continuous struggle of Muhsin e Millat. He made the chain of national and international following madaris.

National
 Jamea-tul-Muntazar, Lahore, Pakistan.
 Jamea Elmia, Karachi, Pakistan.
 Jamea Quran-o-Etrat, Sialkot, Pakistan.
 Madrasa Elmia Naeem-ul-Wa'aezeen, Sahiwal, Pakistan .
 Jamea Madina-tul-Elm, Islamabad, Pakistan.
 Jamea Mahdavia Toba Take Singh, Pakistan.
 Jamea for Girls, Toba Take Sing, Pakistan.
 Jamea Aal-e-Muhammad, Jun pur, Raheem Yar Khan, Pakistan.
 Jamea-tul-Raza, Rohri, Pakistan.
 Jamea Imam-ul-Sajjad, Jhang, Pakistan
 Jamea-tul-Imam-ul-Hussain, Khanqah-Dogra, Pakistan.
 Jamea Rizvia, Azeez-ul-Madaris, Cheechawatni, Pakistan.
 Jamea-tul-Naqvia, Azad Kashmir, Pakistan.
 Jamea Ayatollah Khui, Shor Kot Cant, Pakistan.
 Jamea Taleem-ul-Islam, Silanwali, Sargodha, Pakistan.
 Jamea Fatimia, Rinala Khord, Pakistan.
 Jamea Salman Farsi, Attock, Pakistan.
 Jamea Islamia Baqiyyat-Ullah, Lahore, Pakistan.
 Madrasa Jaferia, Jund, Attock, Pakistan.
 Madrasa Madina-tul-Elm, Qilla Sitar Shah, Shekhopura, Pakistan.
 Madrasa Wali Asr, Sukardu, Bultistan, Pakistan.
 Madrasaiya Rizvia, Saleh Put, Sindh, Pakistan.
 Madrasa-tul-Zehra, Lahore, Pakistan.
 Madrasa Faizia, Naseerabade, Balochistan, Pakistan.
 Madina-tul-Elm, Rawalpindi, Pakistan.
 Madrasa Madina-tul-Elm, Lahore, Pakistan.
 Madrasa Khatem-un-Nabiyeen, Quetta, Pakistan.

International
 Jamea-tul-Muntazr, UK
 Jamea Wali Asr, USA
 Madrasa Imam-ul-Muntazar, Qum, Iran.
 Jamea-tul-Muntazar, Mashad Muqadas, Iran.
 Jamea-tul-Muntazar (for Girls) Qum, Iran.

On one occasion he said to his companions "Sheir Shah Suri was built 1500 miles road from Peshawar to Snar village (Calcutta, India) and after every 10 miles there was a restaurant, water well and post choky built." Then he said "I want to  Madaris on G.T. road (Shahrah e Pakistan), a madrasa after every 50 miles" and "I want to see religious madrasa in every district there should be madrasa" He also acted upon his statement. It was the mission of Muhsin e Millat to establish a worldwide system of Madaris.

Publications
Allama Najafi started a monthly Islamic magazine with the title of Al-Muntazar for the children, adults, women and all the community, he was also the writer of 40 Books on different topics and translated more than 60 books.

Translation into Urdu
 Tafseer e Namoona the commentary of the Quran written by Grand Ayatollah Naser Makarem Shirazi, 27 volumes.
 Tafseer e Mauzooee, the topical commentary of the Quran written by Grand Ayatollah Naser Makarem Shirazi, 10 volumes.
 Tazkira tul Khawaas, written by Sibt ibn e Jaozi.
 Tozih ul Masail, written by Imam Khomaini "Tozih ul Masail".
 Hukumat e Islami, written by Imam Khomaini named "Wilayat e Faqeeh". (1972)
 Tafseer e Mauzooee, the topical commentary of the Quran written by Grand Ayatollah Ja‘far Sobhani, 14, volumes .

 Ahsan ul Maqaal, written by Sheikh Abbas Qumi "Muntahi ul Aamaal".
 Intekhaab Tabari, written by Ibn e Jurair Tabari.
 Sa'ada tul Abadia, written by Sheikh Abbas Qumi.
 Nafas ul Mahmoom, written by Sheikh Abbas Qumi.
 Wilayat e Faqeeh written by Ayatollah Hussain Ali Muntazeri 4 volumes.
 Madan ul Jawahir,
 Irshad ul Quloob, written by Allama Muhammad Baqir Majlasi
 Aqaed e Imamia, written by Sheikh Muhammad Raza Muzaffar Najafi.
 Barah Imami Shia aur Ahl ul Bayt (a.s),
 Aitraaf e Haqiqat,
 Ifadiat e Mahafel o Majalis ke Awamil,
 Risala tul Mawaiz,
 Hujjat e Isna Asharia,
 Shia Isna Asharia,
 Chehel (40) Hadith, written by Syed Ali Fani.
 Al Sibtan fi Maoqef e Hima,
 Mubadiat e Hukomat e Islami,
 Al Irshad, written by Sheikh Mufid, Named Tazkara tul Athar.
 Huqooq aur Islam,
 Jahad e Akbar,
 Markae Haq o Batil,
 Yazidi Firqah,
 Manasek e Hujj,
 Kitab e Ziaraat,
 Hodood o Ta'ziraat,
 Islami Jomhoriya par Aiterazaat, Deen o Aql ki Roshni main,
 Deen e Huq Aql ki Roshni main,
 Kitab al Saqifa,
 Hamary Aimma – Seerat e Aimma, 12 small booklets.
 Irfan ul Majalis,
 etc.

Shagerdan (distinguished personalities)
 Grand Ayatollah Hafiz Basheer Hussain Najafi.
 Ayatollah Hafiz Riaz Hussain Najafi, He succeeded Allama Safdar Hussain as the principal of Hawza e Ilmia Jamea tul Muntazar.
 Maulana Sheikh Muhsin Ali Najafi, Principal of Madrasa Jamea Ahl ul Bayt, Islamabad.
 Maulana Syed Ashiq Hussain Najafi, Principal of Jamea tul Ghadeer.
 Maulana Sheikh Karamat Ali Imrani, Principal of Jamea Jafariya, Gujranwala.
 Ayatollah Hassan Raza Ghadeeri, Principal of Jamea tul Muntazar London.
 Maulana Moosa Beig Najafi, mentor Jamea tul Muntazar.
 Maulana Baqir Ali Shigri, mentor Jamea tul Muntazar, (late).
 Maulana Taj ud deen Haidari, (late).
 Maulana Muhammad Aslam Sadeqi, mentor Jamea tul Muntazar.
 Maulana Qazi Niaz Hussain Naqvi, mentor Jamea tul Muntazar.
 Maulana Manzoor Hussain Abidi.
 Maulana Muhammad Hussain Akbar, Principal of Minhaj al Quran.
 Maulana Syed Muhammad Abbas, mentor Jamea tul Muntazar, (late).
 Maulana Syed Khadim Hussain Naqvi, mentor Jamea tul Muntazar.
 Maulana Abul Hassan Naqvi, Masjad e Jumkaran, Qum, Iran.
 Maulana Hafiz Syed Muhammad Sibtain Naqvi. (late)
 Ayatollah Syed Ali Naqi Naqvi Qumi, Principal of Jamea Islamia Baqiyyat-Ullah, Lahore and mentor Jamea tul Muntazar.
 Dr Allama Syed Ibrar Hussain Abedi president Idara Sada e Islam Pakistan

See also
 Profiles of Intelligence, Brig. Syed A.I. Tirmazi, SI (M) P. 278 & 280, Bookseller: Amazing Books International, Delhi, India 1995.
 The Holy Qur'ãn in South Asia, (a bio-bibliographic study of translations of the Holy Qur'ãn in 23 South Asian languages) Author: Mofakhkhar Hussain Khan, Publisher: Dhaka : Bibi Akhtar Prakãs?ani, 2001.
 The madrasa in Asia, (political activism and transnational linkages) P. 132, Author: Farish Ahmad-Noor, Yåogåindar Sikkand, Martin van Bruinessen, Publisher: Amsterdam, NL : Amsterdam University Press, ©2008.
 www.islamic-laws.com/marja/safdarhussain.htm
 Allama Syed Muhammad Yar Shah Najafi
 Allama Hussain Bakhsh Jarra
 Grand Ayatollah Muhammad Hussain Najafi
 Tehrik-e-Jafaria Pakistan (TJP)
 Allama Mufti Jafar Hussain
 Allama Syed Sajid Ali Naqvi
 Allama Arif Hussain Hussaini

References

Bibliography
 Grand Ayatollah Bazurg Tehrani (1974–), Az-Zareeya ila Tasaaneef us-Shia (A List of Shia Books), Hawza Elmia Najaf Ashraf, Iraq.
 Aal ul Bayt Global Information Centre, Musaniffat-us-Shia (Shia Books), Aal ul Bayt Global Information Centre.
 Maulana Syed Hussain Arif Naqvi, Tazkarae Ulama e Imamia, Pakistan.
 Maulana Riaz Hussain Jafari, Mayyar-e-Mawaddat (Ayatollah Allama Syed Muhammad Yar Shah Najafi ki Majalis ka Majmoo'a), Idara Minhaj-us-Saalehin, Lahore, Pakistan.
 Maulana Riaz Hussain Jafari, tazkara-e-Mawaddat (Allama Syed Safdar Hussain Najafi ki Majalis ka Majmoo'a), Idara Minhaj-us-Saalehin, Lahore, Pakistan.

External links
 http://www.alibrary.org/
 http://www.jmuntazar.org/Principals.htm
 http://www.tafseer-e-namona.com/
 http://www.ziyaraat.net/findbook.asp?srchwhat=All&LibroID=405&AgregarVista=Si&page=5&Archivo=TafseereNamoona1of15.pdf&escritor=All&tema=Quran&idioma=All&orderby=titulo
 http://abna.ir/data.asp?lang=3&Id=229907
 http://www.fetrat.com/en/WFM_News.aspx?FLD_ID=699

1932 births
1989 deaths
People from Muzaffargarh District
People from Muzaffargarh
Punjabi people
Pakistani Shia Muslims
Pakistani scholars
Shia scholars of Islam
Pakistani Islamic religious leaders